Taxusin is a taxane isolate derived from Taxus wallichiana. Taxusin can be used to synthesize taxadiene -diol and -triol derivatives via deoxygenation.

See also
 Taxoid 7beta-hydroxylase
 Yunnanxane
 Hongdoushans

References

Taxanes
Acetate esters
Vinylidene compounds